Comète was a  of the French Navy. She took part in the Atlantic campaign of 1806 and in the Battle of San Domingo.

Construction
Comète was laid down at Le Havre, France, in October 1794 and launched on 11 March 1796. She entered service in January 1798.

Service history
On 19 February 1806, Comète, the frigate , and the corvette  captured and burned the American vessel Lark, Moore, master, which was sailing from Philadelphia, Pennsylvania, to Jamaica.

From June 1808, Comète served as a mast machine at Bayonne, France. She was broken up in 1810.

Notes

Citations and references

Citations

References

Age of Sail frigates of France
Romaine-class frigates
1796 ships
Ships built in France